Sensei is an honorific term in Japan.

Sensei may also refer to:

Arts and entertainment
 Sensei (DC Comics), a fictional villain in the DC Comics universe
 Sensei, a fictional penguin from the online game Club Penguin
 Sensei (band), a melodic rock band from Jacksonville, Florida
 "Sensei", a track on the 2017 album Heartbreak on a Full Moon by Chris Brown
 Sensei (First Comics), a four-issue limited series published in 1989
 The Sensei, an independent feature film
Sensei!, 2017 film
 Sensei (wrestler), Mexican masked professional wrestler

Other uses
 Sensei robotic catheter system, a medical device in interventional cardiology
 Sensei Lānai, a wellness center on Lānai, Hawaii

See also
 O-Sensei (comics), a fictional character in the DC Comics universe
Sansai (disambiguation)